Blauen may refer to:

 Blauen (Badenweiler), a mountain in the Black Forest, Germany
 Blauen, Basel-Landschaft, municipality in the canton of Basel-Country in Switzerland